Epigynopteryx is a genus of moths in the family Geometridae. The genus was described by Warren in 1895.

Species
Species of this genus are:

Epigynopteryx affirmata Herbulot, 1997
Epigynopteryx africana (Aurivillius, 1910)
Epigynopteryx altivagans Herbulot, 1993
Epigynopteryx ansorgei (Warren, 1901)
Epigynopteryx artemis Viette, 1973
Epigynopteryx aurantiaca Herbulot, 1965
Epigynopteryx borgeaudi (Herbulot, 1957)
Epigynopteryx captiva Herbulot, 1997
Epigynopteryx castanea Viette, 1977
Epigynopteryx coffeae Prout, 1934
Epigynopteryx colligata (Saalmüller, 1891)
Epigynopteryx commixta Warren, 1901
Epigynopteryx curvimargo (Hampson, 1909)
Epigynopteryx declinans Herbulot, 1965
Epigynopteryx dia Viette, 1973
Epigynopteryx dorcas Prout, 1932
Epigynopteryx duboisi Herbulot, 1981
Epigynopteryx eudallasta D. S. Fletcher, 1978
Epigynopteryx eugonia Prout, 1935
Epigynopteryx fimosa (Warren, 1905)
Epigynopteryx flavedinaria (Guenée, 1857)
Epigynopteryx flexa Prout, 1931
Epigynopteryx fulva (Warren, 1897)
Epigynopteryx glycera Prout, 1934
Epigynopteryx guichardi Wiltshire, 1982
Epigynopteryx impunctata (Warren, 1898)
Epigynopteryx indiscretaria (Mabille, 1898)
Epigynopteryx jacksoni Carcasson, 1964
Epigynopteryx langaria (Holland, 1920)
Epigynopteryx lioloma Prout, 1931
Epigynopteryx maculosata (Warren, 1901)
Epigynopteryx maeviaria (Guenée, 1858)
Epigynopteryx metrocamparia (Bastelberger, 1908)
Epigynopteryx modesta (Butler, 1880)
Epigynopteryx molochina Herbulot, 1984
Epigynopteryx mutabilis (Warren, 1903)
Epigynopteryx nigricola (Warren, 1897)
Epigynopteryx ommatoclesis (Prout, 1922)
Epigynopteryx piperata (Saalmüller, 1880)
Epigynopteryx prolixa (Prout, 1915)
Epigynopteryx prophylacis Herbulot, 1984
Epigynopteryx pygmaea Herbulot, 1957
Epigynopteryx rougeoti Herbulot, 1977
Epigynopteryx scotti D. S. Fletcher, 1959
Epigynopteryx silvestris Herbulot, 1954
Epigynopteryx stictigramma (Hampson, 1909)
Epigynopteryx straminea (Warren, 1897)
Epigynopteryx subspersa (Warren, 1897)
Epigynopteryx tabitha Warren, 1901
Epigynopteryx tenera Viette, 1973
Epigynopteryx termininota Prout, 1934
Epigynopteryx townsendi D. S. Fletcher, 1958
Epigynopteryx variabile Viette, 1973
Epigynopteryx venosa Herbulot, 1984
Epigynopteryx xeres Viette, 1973

References
Butler, 1880. "On a collection of Lepidoptera from Madagascar, with descriptions of new Genera and Species". Annals and Magazine of Natural History (5) 5 (28): 333–344, (29): 384-395
 

Geometridae